טאהש (from Yiddish transliterated "Tash", from Hebrew transliterated "Tosh") may refer to:
 Tosh (Hasidic dynasty), a Jewish community
 Kiryas Tosh, a Hassidic neighbourhood in Boisbriand, Quebec, Canada
 Nyírtass or טאהש, a village in Hungary that hosted a Hassidic community

See also

 Tash (disambiguation)
 Tosh (disambiguation)